Daniel Sargent (born 21 September 1970) is a former British judoka, who won a silver medal at the 2002 Commonwealth Games and is a four times British champion.

Judo career
At the 2002 Commonwealth Games in Manchester, Sargent won the silver medal in the over 100kg category, in the gold medal match he was defeated by Fiji's Nacanieli Qerewaqa.

He is a four times champion of Great Britain, winning the heavyweight division at the British Judo Championships in 1999, 2000, 2001 and 2002.

References

External link

1970 births
Living people
English male judoka
Commonwealth Games silver medallists for England
Judoka at the 2002 Commonwealth Games
Commonwealth Games medallists in judo
Medallists at the 2002 Commonwealth Games